Your Face Sounds Familiar is the Greek version of the international reality television franchise Your Face Sounds Familiar, developed by Endemol. The show premiered on 14 April 2013 on ANT1.

From series 1 until series 4, the show was Live but from series 5, the show will be filmed.

Format 
The show consists of twelve live shows, where ten celebrities (singers and actors) try to incarnate various stars of the Greek and worldwide music industry. The contestants are evaluated by the judges of the show, the audience and the other contestants. The judges have to evaluate the contestants each live from 3 to 12 with 12 being the judge's favorite of the night. Each contestant gives five extra points to one of the other contestants, who was their favorite of the night. The judges' score is combined with the five extra points and that final score is combined with the audience's voting to determine the winner of the night. No one will be eliminating, but the winner will be according to the total score of each live. However the winner of each live show will give the money collected during the night from the audience's voting to a charity of their choice.

Cast

Hosts 
The host for all the seasons of the show is Maria Bekatorou

Key:
 Previous
 Current

Judges 
Alexandros Rigas, Gerasimos Gennatas, Katerina Gagaki and Bessy Malfa were the judges of the first season. Rigas, Gagaki and Malfa returned as judges for the second season while Gennatas is replaced by Takis Zacharatos. The judging panel for the third season was changed completely with Katerina Papoutsaki, Nikos Moutsinas, Petros Filippidis and Stamatis Fasoulis replacing the previous judges. In the fourth season, Filippidis and Papoutsaki were replaced by Fotis Sergoulopoulos and Elli Kokkinou.

Key: Previous Current Guest judge Contestant

Series overview

Season 1 (2013) 

The first season premiered on April 14, 2013, on ANT1 and the contestants were five women and five men; Anta Livitsanou, Crystallia, Mando, Sylvia Delikoura, Thomai Apergi, Konstantinos Kazakos, Kostas Martakis, Krateros Katsoulis, Nikos Ganos and Thanasis Alevras.

The trailer of the season featured a man transforming to Madonna and singing "Like a Virgin" while Bekatorou says: "It's coming and it will change our Sundays".

The last show was aired on June 30, 2013, and the winner of the season was the actor Thanasis Alevras.

Season 2 (2014) 

The second season of the show premiered on March 9, 2014, on ANT1 and the contestants are five women and five men; Eleftheria Eleftheriou, Sophia Vossou, Betty Maggira, Sophia Kourtidou, Vanessa Adamopoulou, Giannis Savvidakis, Lefteris Eleutheriou, Costas Doxas, Aris Plaskasovitis and Pantelis Kanarakis.

The trailer of the season started airing on February 20, 2014, and it featured an older woman doing her groceries and running into famous figures such as Elvis Presley, Madonna and Michael Jackson. At the counter was the host of the show, Maria Bekatorou, who the woman recognized and told her "Your face sounds familiar".

The last show was aired on June 15, 2014, and the winner of the season was the singer Giannis Savvidakis.

Season 3 (2016) 

The third season of the show premiered on April 3, 2016, on ANT1 and the contestants were five women and five men; Josephine, Apostolia Zoi, Valeria Kouroupi, Eleni Karakasi, Mathildi Maggira, Stamatis Gardelis, Othonas Metaxas, Valandis, Dimos Beke and Giannis Kritikos.

The trailer of the season started airing on March 18, 2016.

The last episode was aired on June 26, 2016, and the winner of the season was the singer Giannis Kritikos.

Season 4 (2017) 

The fourth season of the show premiered on April 23, 2017, on ANT1 and the contestants this time were four women and six men; Sabrina, Irene Trost, Koni Metaxa, Parthena Horozidou, Isaias Matiaba, Aris Makris, Giannis Chatzigeorgiou, Antonis Dominos, Giannis Chatzopoulos and Dimitris Makalias.

The trailer of the season started airing on March 27, 2017.

The last show was aired on July 14, 2017, and the winner of the season was the singer Giannis Chatzigeorgiou.

Season 5 (2019) 

The fifth season of the show premiered on January 27, 2019, on ANT1 and the contestants were five women and five men; Melina Makri, Katerina Stikoudi, Eva Tsachra, Eleni Filini, Chrispa, Argiris Aggelou, Eythimis Zisakis, Vaggelis Panagopoulos, Ian Stratis and Pashalis Tsarouhas.

The trailer of the season started airing on January 2, 2019.

The last episode was aired on May 5, 2019, and the winner of the season was the singer Ian Stratis.

Season 6 (2020) 

The sixth season of the show premiered on February 16, 2020, on ANT1 and the contestants were five women and five men; Evridiki, Maria Androutsou, Danae Loukaki, Tania Breazou, Katerina Koukouraki, Lambis Livieratos, Yiorgos Hraniotis, Stefanos Mouagkie, Nicolas Raptakis and Ilias Bogdanos.

The season discontinued due to COVID-19 pandemic, with the sixth and final episode being aired on March 22, 2020.

Season 7: All Star (2021) 

The seventh season of the show premiered on February 28, 2021. This season will feature ten contestants from the previous seasons, as the all stars, six men and four women: from season one are Thanasis Alevras and Krateros Katsoulis, from season two are Lefteris Eleutheriou, Costas Doxas and Betty Maggira, from season three is Mathildi Maggira, from season four is Isaias Matiaba, from season five are Katerina Stikoudi and Ian Stratis and from season six is Tania Breazou.

The jury voting slightly changed compared to other seasons. The traditional voting (3, 4, 5, 6, 7, 8, 9, 10, 11, 12) changed and the jury now awards 2 sets of 7 points, 2 sets of 8 points, 2 sets of 9, 2 sets of 10, a set of 11 points and a set of 12 points.

Due to the restrictions, social distances and the ongoing lockdown in Greece, there is no live audience. While there is no audience in the studio, the audience watches the live show through Zoom and votes from there for their favorite contestant.

Also, for this season only, the contestants can choose to perform one of their previous season' performances, by pressing the Awesome Card on buzzer.

After the premiere, Costas Doxas withdrew from the show, reducing the number of participants to 9. After Doxas' withdrawal, the jury awards one set of 10 points, instead of two.

References

External links 
 
 

ANT1 original programming
2013 Greek television series debuts
2010s Greek television series
2020s Greek television series
Greek reality television series
Greek

es:Tu cara me suena